There are currently  games in this table across all pages: A to C, D to I, J to P, and Q to Z. It does not include PlayStation minis, PS one Classics or PS2 Classics.

References 

3 games (J-P)
J-P
Video game lists by platform